Edward Joseph Garland (March 16, 1887 – December 19, 1974) was a farmer, diplomat and a Canadian federal politician. He was born in Dublin, Ireland and attended Belvedere College and Trinity College Dublin.

Political career

Garland, an active member of the United Farmers of Alberta, was first elected to the House of Commons of Canada in the 1921 Canadian federal election as a candidate for the Progressive Party of Canada. He defeated two other candidates in a landslide to win his first term in office. A founding member of the radical Ginger Group of MPs, he stood for re-election in the 1925 Canadian federal election, he was barely re-elected in a hotly contested election to win his second term in office. The government was dissolved after the Liberal-Progressive coalition fell apart and he ran for re-election again just a year later in the 1926 Canadian federal election winning re-election this time under the United Farmers of Alberta banner. He stood for re-election and won his fourth term in the 1930 Canadian federal election. Garland was one of the group of radical MPs to meet following the 1930 election and plan the creation of a new party. He was a founding member of that party, the Co-operative Commonwealth Federation, when it was officially launched in 1932 and stood as a CCF candidate but was defeated on his bid for a fifth term in office in the 1935 Canadian federal election by Charles Edward Johnston from the Social Credit Party of Canada.
He served as president of the UFA in the early 1930s.

Diplomatic career

After his career in the Canadian Parliament Garland served as the High Commissioner to Ireland from May 4, 1946 to March 19, 1947. After his term as High Commissioner he served as Canada's first Envoy to Norway from August 25, 1947 and Iceland from March 16, 1949 with both posts ending on August 19, 1952.

References

External links
 
Edward Joseph Garland Head of Posts List

1887 births
1974 deaths
Members of the House of Commons of Canada from Alberta
Progressive Party of Canada MPs
Ginger Group MPs
Co-operative Commonwealth Federation MPs
High Commissioners of Canada to Ireland
United Farmers of Alberta MPs
Ambassadors of Canada to Norway
Ambassadors of Canada to Iceland
Politicians from Dublin (city)
Irish emigrants to Canada (before 1923)
People educated at Belvedere College